The People's Dispensary for Sick Animals (PDSA) is a veterinary charity in the United Kingdom. It was founded in 1917 by Maria Dickin to provide care for sick and injured animals of the poor.

Foundation and development 
During World War I, animal-welfare pioneer Maria Dickin worked to improve the dreadful state of animal health in the Whitechapel area of London. She wanted to open a clinic where East Enders living in poverty could receive free treatment for their sick and injured animals. Despite widespread scepticism, she opened her free "dispensary" in a Whitechapel basement on 17 November 1917. She put out a sign that read: "Bring your sick animals! Do not let them suffer! All animals treated. All treatment free".

On its first day of opening, the dispensary only attracted four patients. However, among these patients, was the owner of a limping donkey, who was amazed at the PDSA's free services for him. While trekking along many miles for his work, the donkey owner served as a publicity agent for the clinic and told everyone he met, what the PDSA had done for him, emphasising its free services. It soon became a success, and Dickin was soon forced to find larger premises. The clinic upgraded from a clergyman's cellar into a shop and four rooms, opposite the People's Palace.

By 1922 the PDSA had opened seven clinics across London, treating up to 70,000 animals a year.

Within six years, Maria Dickin had designed and equipped her first horse-drawn clinic, and soon, a fleet of mobile dispensaries was established.

Further success allowed the PDSA to open their first clinic outside London in Salford in 1923. Following this, the PDSA Sanatorium was established in Ilford in 1928, with Dickin's passion to train more PDSA practitioners. By 1926–27, the PDSA was operating 57 clinics and three travelling caravans, and had treated almost 410,000 patients in a year at a cost of £43,085 at its various premises across Britain.

In 1931, an annual Christmas Market of the People's Dispensary for Sick Animals was held at the Royal Albert Hall on 24 and 25 November. A 10-ton Christmas pudding, the largest ever created up until that time, was featured. The recipe became known as the "Prince of Wales' Empire Christmas Pudding". The Times newspaper noted "The Lord Mayor of London has promised to give the pudding its first 'stir'. He will be followed by the High Commissioners of the Dominions, and afterwards the general public will have the chance of stirring it". The Prince of Wales (later Edward VIII) was then a patron of the charity. In 1973, Princess Alexandra, The Honourable Lady Ogilvy, became the charity's patron.

By 1935, the PDSA had 11 motor caravan clinics travelling around the country. When the Second World War started, the PDSA had five animal hospitals, 71 dispensaries and the 11 mobile caravan dispensaries. Their rescue squads helped more than 250,000 pets injured or buried in rubble caused by the Blitz.
Eventually, PDSA's role was defined by two Acts of Parliament, in 1949 and 1956, that continue to govern its activities today.

Awards 

Maria Dickin instituted the Dickin Medal in 1943 to acknowledge outstanding acts of bravery by animals serving with the Armed Forces or Civil Defence units.  It has become recognised as the animals' Victoria Cross, and is administered by PDSA.

The PDSA created a second animal bravery award, the PDSA Gold Medal, in 2002, which is now recognised as the animal equivalent of the George Cross.

In 2014, the PDSA Order of Merit was instituted to recognise outstanding examples of animal devotion to their owners or society; it is the animal equivalent of the OBE. , it has been awarded to 12 horses, the first being police horse Grace, and 20 dogs, the latest being Springer Spaniel Max, the first pet to receive the award.

Eligibility requirements 

Today, treatment is only available to the pets of those in receipt of Housing Benefit or Council Tax Benefit, and who live in one of the charity's 'catchment areas'.  For those eligible, treatment for sick and injured animals is free of charge. Recently, the PDSA started providing eligible pet owners with preventive services such as neutering, vaccinations, and microchipping.  These services are the only treatments that are not free, but are offered at cost.

Although free for all treatments except for those of a preventive nature, PDSA asks clients to make a donation of whatever they can afford towards the treatment of their animals.

, PDSA was able to offer its services to 75% of eligible people, and planned to increase this to 80% over the next year.

In May 2009, the PDSA began requesting a donation on checking in an animal for treatment.

Areas of operation 

PDSA operates throughout Great Britain through animal hospitals and practices; a vast network of charity shops support the organisation.  It has one animal hospital in Northern Ireland, the catchment area of which covers much of the area east of the Bann.  Although further hospitals are not currently planned for that region, some services through private clinics may be offered, and a charity shop was due to open in March 2007 in Lisburn.  The charity's head office is based in Telford, Shropshire.

In 1937, a branch of the PDSA was founded in District Six, South Africa, which at the time was a poverty-stricken area of Cape Town. In 1988, the organization became autonomous, but maintains a strong link with the mother society in the United Kingdom and a great deal of information is exchanged between them.

In October 1938, the PDSA held a Twenty-First Birthday Dinner at the Holborn Restaurant in London, attended by Mrs Dickin. There were words from abroad from France (Mr Horne), Dutch East Indies (Mr Cronin), Romania (Mr Smith), and Greece (Mr Hurle).

Celebrity ambassadors 
Joanna Page

Roobarb and Custard Partnership 

In 2012, Bulldog Licensing, the brand licensing agency for Roobarb and Custard, pledged a long-term link with PDSA to help raise £1M. The characters have already appeared on a range of PDSA T-shirts, modelled and supported by singer and TV presenter Alesha Dixon.

Pet Fit Club 

In 2005, the PDSA launched its Pet Fit Club competition, to help battle the problem of pet obesity. The annual contest has a group of overweight dogs, cats, and rabbits embark on a strict, six-month diet and exercise programme, specially tailored by PDSA vets and nurses. At the end of the programme, the best-performing pet is crowned slimmer of the year. In 2015, small furry pets such as guinea pigs, hamsters, rats, and mice were allowed to take part in the competition for the first time.

References

External links
 PDSA Web site
 

Animal charities based in the United Kingdom
1917 establishments in the United Kingdom
Animal welfare organisations based in the United Kingdom
Organisations based in Shropshire
Organizations established in 1917
Telford and Wrekin
Veterinary medicine in the United Kingdom